Beyond Apollo is a science fiction novel by American writer  Barry N. Malzberg, first published in 1972 in a hardcover edition by Random House.
Malzberg credits the inspiration for the novel to "I Have My Vigil", a 1969 short story by fellow science fiction writer Harry Harrison.

Plot summary
The novel's protagonist is Harry M. Evans, the lone survivor of the disastrous first crewed expedition to the planet Venus. Evans provides details of the doomed expedition as a novel in progress, and he proves to be a remarkably unreliable narrator, constantly changing the particulars of his story as it progresses. It quickly becomes apparent to the reader that he may be completely insane, as a feeling of deep (and comical) paranoia underlies Evans's descriptions of the absurd conversations that ensue with the Venusian inhabitants. There is some indication that Evans could very well have murdered his fellow crewmember. The novel ends with a publishing house offering to purchase the rights to Evans's outlandish tale.

Literary significance and criticism
Like much of Malzberg's work, Beyond Apollo was extremely controversial at the time of its publication, receiving both praise and scorn from literary critics.

Joanna Russ praised the novel as "a passionate, fine, completely realized work," noting that Malzberg's repetitive use of particular words transformed them into "a kind of Greek chorus, a terrible, poignant insistence on something that is not quite in the story but yet comes through the story." Harlan Ellison commented that "Beyond Apollo put me out of commission for three days after reading it".

On the other hand, Bob Shaw said in Foundation, "Malzberg's Beyond Apollo is, to me, the epitome of everything that has gone wrong with sf in the last ten years or so".

The novel won the first John W. Campbell Memorial Award for Best Science Fiction Novel, presented in 1973.

See also 
Barry N. Malzberg bibliography

References
Notes

Bibliography

 Clute, John and Peter Nicholls. The Encyclopedia of Science Fiction. New York: St. Martin's Griffin, 1993 (2nd edition 1995). .
 Pringle, David. The Ultimate Guide to Science Fiction. London: Grafton Books, 1990. .
 Reginald, Robert. Science Fiction and Fantasy Literature, 1975-1991. Detroit; Washington, DC; London: Gale Research, Inc., 1992. .

External links
 

1972 American novels
1972 science fiction novels
Fiction set in 1981
American science fiction novels
Fiction with unreliable narrators
John W. Campbell Award for Best Science Fiction Novel-winning works
Space exploration novels
Novels set on Venus